The S'gaw,( or ) also known as Skaw, S'gaw, S'gau, White Karen, Paganyaw, Pgaz Cgauz and Pakayo, are an ethnic group of Burma and Thailand. They speak the S'gaw Karen language.

The S'gaw are a subgroup of the Karen people. They are also referred to by the exonym "White Karen", a term dating from colonial times and used in contrast to the Karenni (or "Red Karen") and the Pa'O (or "Black Karen"), even though the latter often rejected the term "Karen" to refer to themselves.

The S'gaw live primarily in eastern Burma (Karen State, Mon state, Karenni state). Many of them migrate to Thai-Burmese border and live there as a refugees for many decades due to conflict in Karen state. S'gaw people are the founder of the Karen National Union (KNU).

Origins

Karen (S'gaw and Pwo) legend refer to a 'river of running sand' which they believe Pu Taw Meh Pa led the Karen people across the river of the running sand. Many Karen think this refers to the Gobi Desert, although they have lived in Burma for centuries. The legend made the Karen people believe that they are from Mongolia.

See also
 Karen people
 Karen Baptist Convention
 Karen Baptist Theological Seminary
 Karen of the Andamans

References

Ethnic groups in Myanmar
Ethnic groups in Thailand